Nonentity may refer to:
The Nonentity, a 1922 British silent adventure film
Nonentity (Water III: Fan Black Dada), a 1988 album by experimental rock composer Zoogz Rift
Autobiography: Some Notes on a Nonentity, a 1963 essay by H. P. Lovecraft
Eminent Nonentities, a 1971 collection of short stories by Alaric Jacob